Mirela Dedić (born 15 December 1991) is an Austrian handball player for Hypo Niederösterreich and the Austrian national team.

Referencer 

1991 births
Living people
Austrian female handball players
People from Bruck an der Mur
Sportspeople from Styria